Blue Blood is an album by American guitarist James Blood Ulmer recorded in 2000 and released on Bill Laswell's  Innerhythmic label in 2001. The album features performances by Ulmer with Laswell, Bernie Worrell, and Amina Claudine Myers who initially recorded South Delta Space Age as Third Rail in 1995.

Reception
Allmusic awarded the album 4 stars and the review by Thom Jurek stated, "there is a deep nighttime feeling to this disc; there are few tracks featuring the fire-spitting, wood-splintering knot-like runs that come flailing off the strings and melt the brain of the listener. This is a riff- and song-oriented recording (yes, there are vocals) that accent the blues and gospel side of Ulmer's playing... There are one or two misses here, but they're no big deal compared to the wealth of good stuff".

Track listing
All compositions by James Blood Ulmer except as indicated
 "O Gentle One" - 6:06  
 "As It Is" (Jerome Brailey, Bill Laswell, Ulmer) - 5:25  
 "99 Names" (Traditional arranged Ulmer) - 4:55  
 "On and On" (Jamal Cantero, Erica Wright) - 3:56  
 "Pull on up to Love" - 4:46  
 "Momentarily" (Brailey, Laswell, Ulmer) - 5:56  
 "We Got to Get Together" - 5:28  
 "I Can Tell" - 4:42  
 "Home Alone" - 6:59
Recorded at Orange Music, Orange NJ

Personnel
James Blood Ulmer - guitar, vocals
Bill Laswell - bass
Bernie Worrell, Amina Claudine Myers - keyboards
Jerome Bigfoot Brailey - drums

References

Innerhythmic Records albums
James Blood Ulmer albums
2001 albums
albums produced by Bill Laswell